Maharot, the second over-all album from the Filipino rock band, Kamikazee. It has 15 tracks and was released on 2006. It also is their first album under Universal Records. In May 2009 the album attained Double Platinum Award. The song "First Day High" was used as a soundtrack to the movie with the movie First Day High.

Track listing 

SpongeJoseph SquarePants: parody for the soundtrack of Nickelodeon show SpongeBob SquarePants

Personnel 
Jay Contreras (vocals)
Jomal Linao (guitars/backing vocals)
Led Tuyay (guitars/backing vocals)
Puto Astete (bass)
Bords Burdeos (drums)

Additional Musicians:
Kaye Abad - Additional Vocals (track 3)
Bboy Garcia – turntables (track 11)
Jonathan Ong - Additional Keyboards and samples

Album Credits 
Executive Producer: Kathleen Dy-Go
Album Design: Allan Bordeos
Concept by: Kamikazee
Photogtaphy by: Carina Altamonte
Co-Produced by: Angee Rozul, Allan "Bords" Burdeos, Jonathan Ong, 8 Toleran
All Instruments are recorded at: Tracks Records except (track 5,9,13,15) recorded at Sonic State
All Vocals recorded at: Sonic State except (track 6,8,12) recorded at tracks studios
Digitally Mastered by: Angee Rozul

References 

2006 albums
Kamikazee albums